My Wife Is a Gambling Maestro ( is a 2008 Hong Kong film directed by Wong Jing, it is a parody to his early God of Gamblers, featuring a female lead (played by Natalie Meng) as a master gambler and a romantic comedy storyline.

Cast
 Nick Cheung
 Natalie Meng Yao
 Cheung Tat Ming
 Ben Cheung Ka Lun
 Danny Chan Kwok Kwan
 Wong Jing
 Samuel Pang King Chi
 Winnie Leung Man Yee
 Jacqueline Chong
 Yedda Chiu Tong
 Lee Lik Chi

External links
 
 LoveHKfilm entry
 HK cinemagic entry

2008 films
2008 romantic comedy films
Hong Kong romantic comedy films
Films directed by Wong Jing
2000s Hong Kong films